Charles Shaw-Lefevre, 1st Viscount Eversley, GCB, PC (22 February 1794 – 28 December 1888), was a British Whig politician. He served as Speaker of the House of Commons from 1839 to 1857. He is the second-longest serving Speaker of the House of Commons, behind Arthur Onslow.

Background and education
Shaw-Lefevre was the son of Charles Shaw-Lefevre by his wife Helena, daughter of John Lefevre. His younger brother, Sir John Shaw-Lefevre, was a senior civil servant and one of the founders of the University of London, while his nephew, George, was a Liberal politician. He was educated at Winchester and Trinity College, Cambridge. In 1819 he was called to the Bar, Lincoln's Inn.

Political career

A Whig, he was Member of Parliament for Downton from 1830 to 1831, for Hampshire from 1831 to 1832 and for North Hampshire from 1832 to 1857. During the 1830s he was chairman of a committee on petitions for private bills and of a committee on agricultural distress. His report from the latter position was not accepted by the House of Commons but was published as a pamphlet addressed to his constituents. He acquired, says the Encyclopædia Britannica, "a high reputation in the House of Commons for his judicial fairness, combined with singular tact and courtesy." When James Abercromby retired as Speaker of the House of Commons in 1839, Shaw-Lefevre was put forward as the Whig candidate and defeated the Tory candidate Henry Goulburn by 317 votes to 299. He was sworn of the Privy Council at the same time.

Shaw-Lefevre remained speaker until 1857, by which time he was second-longest-serving speaker ever, after Arthur Onslow, who held the post for more than 33 years. On his retirement in 1857 he was elevated to the peerage as Viscount Eversley, of Heckfield in the County of Southampton. He attended the House of Lords infrequently, with his last recorded speech in July 1873.

Other work
Shaw-Lefevre was director of the insurance company Sun Fire Office from 1815 to 1841, Recorder of Basingstoke 1823–35, and Chairman of Hampshire Quarter Sessions 1850–79. He also served in his father's North Hampshire Yeomanry Cavalry as a lieutenant in 1821, and was Lieutenant-Colonel Commandant in 1823–27 and 1831–68, when he became its Honorary Lt-Col.

In 1857 he was appointed Governor of the Isle of Wight, which he remained until 1888. He was also an ecclesiastical commissioner and a trustee of the British Museum. In 1885 he was made a Knight Grand Cross of the Order of the Bath (GCB).

Family
Lord Eversley married Emma Laura (d. 1857), daughter of Samuel Whitbread and Lady Elizabeth Grey, in 1817. They had three sons, who all died in infancy, and two daughters. The family lived at Heckfield Place in Hampshire, which was previously the seat of his maternal grandfather. Lady Eversley died in June 1857. Lord Eversley survived her by over thirty years and died in December 1888, aged 94. He is buried at Kensal Green Cemetery, London. As he had no surviving sons, the title became extinct on his death. The Eversley title was revived in 1906 in favour of his nephew, George Shaw-Lefevre.

Arms

References

External links 

Eversley, Charles Shaw-Lefevre, 1st Viscount
Eversley, Charles Shaw-Lefevre, 1st Viscount
Speakers of the House of Commons of the United Kingdom
Eversley, Charles Shaw-Lefevre, 1st Viscount
Eversley, Charles Shaw-Lefevre, 1st Viscount
Burials at Kensal Green Cemetery
Eversley, Charles Shaw-Lefevre, 1st Viscount
Members of the Parliament of the United Kingdom for English constituencies
Eversley, Charles Shaw-Lefevre, 1st Viscount
Whig (British political party) MPs for English constituencies
UK MPs 1830–1831
UK MPs 1831–1832
UK MPs 1832–1835
UK MPs 1835–1837
UK MPs 1837–1841
UK MPs 1841–1847
UK MPs 1847–1852
UK MPs 1852–1857
UK MPs who were granted peerages
Members of the Privy Council of the United Kingdom
Eversley
Peers of the United Kingdom created by Queen Victoria
Church Estates Commissioners